"Gettin' Jiggy wit It" is a song by American rapper and actor Will Smith, released as the third single from his debut solo album, Big Willie Style (1997). The verse is based around a sample of "He's the Greatest Dancer" by Sister Sledge, and the chorus is sampled from "Sang and Dance" by the Bar-Kays. Released on January 26, 1998, the song was Smith's second hit produced by Poke & Tone and L.E.S., who replaced his long-time partner Jazzy Jeff, though the record-scratching techniques of Jazzy Jeff can be heard in the song.

The song spent three weeks at the top of the Billboard Hot 100 chart from March 14, 1998. It also won a Grammy Award in 1999 for the Best Rap Solo Performance. It was ranked the 68th greatest song of the 1990s by VH1. However, it was ranked at number 19 on the list of AOL Radio's 100 Worst Songs Ever in 2010. The song was included in Pitchfork Medias 2010 list of "The Seven Worst U.S. No. 1 Singles of the 90s".

Composition
The song samples the 1979 Sister Sledge song "He's the Greatest Dancer". The "mama-uh, mama-uh, mama come closer" line is a reference to the song "Soul Makossa" by Manu Dibango, specifically the version adapted by Michael Jackson in "Wanna Be Startin' Somethin'"'s final bridge. The connotations associated with the expression getting jiggy were heavily influenced by this single. The term was originally a description of sexy fashion or style, but expanded to include dancing skill.

Smith has attested in an interview that his inspiration to alter the meaning for the purpose of the song came from his association of the term "jiggy" with "jigaboo", a derogatory term for African-Americans, which made the literal meaning of the title "getting African-American with it" and which was meant to reference the popular folk-myth of an innate sense of rhythm in black folks. The co-opting of a once offensive word also was racially empowering.

Critical reception
Larry Flick from Billboard wrote, "This intriguingly titled single is a sweet cross between rap and dance styles—perhaps even outrageous R&B? Despite his success in Hollywood, Smith keeps music close to his heart. He delivers a happy rap song—very upbeat, indeed. A background mixture of children's voices gives this single an interesting twist, which provides pleasant interference. The vivacious bass sound makes "Gettin' Jiggy Wit It" stand up on its feet. Even though it is repetitive, it's really a great one for those rap lovers out there. Get listening!" Pan-European magazine Music & Media said, "Musician-cum-actor Smith seems to have an infallible knack for simply irresistible poppy R&B. This time around, Sister Sledge's much-loved 1979 disco smash 'He's The Greatest Dancer' serves as the foundation for his third surefire hit in a row." Alan Jones from Music Week felt that "after the disappointing chart foray of his current single, Will Smith returns in double Quicktime with Gettin' Jiggy Wit It, a more lively rap laced with samples from three prior hits (...) which provides the melody, rhythm and class for a fine effort that will instantly restore Smith to the Top 20."

Music video
The accompanying music video for the song was directed by American director Hype Williams and was filmed at various hotels on the Las Vegas Strip, including the New York-New York Hotel and Casino, The Mirage, and the foyer of the Luxor Las Vegas.

The video features a series of tableaux including a Deee-Lite-inspired sequence, a glitzy Puffa jacket-style choreographed studio dance routine, a sequence set in Ancient Egypt and a volcano-backed Hawaiian/ Māori segment. Other music styles, including Bollywood, are referenced. The video closes with Smith dancing beneath the Statue of Liberty replica at the New York-New York Hotel and Casino.

"Gettin' Jiggy wit It" won the 1998 MTV Video Music Award for Best Rap Video. The song was also nominated for four additional awards, including Best Choreography, Viewer's Choice, Best Dance Video, and Video of the Year, but these further nominations were lost to Madonna for her song "Ray of Light".

References in popular culture
In the 1999 film Superstar, lead character Mary Katherine Gallagher gets advice from Jesus Christ, played by Will Ferrell, telling her to "Get jiggy wit it, Na na na na na na". In the Seinfeld episode "The Reverse Peephole", Jerry is disappointed at not being selected as DJ for a house party, stating, "I was ready to get jiggy with it!"

The song has also been spoofed and covered by various artists. DJ Screw created a chopped and screwed version of the song. Jam band Phish covered the song on their 1999 album Hampton Comes Alive. The song was referenced in the King Crimson song "The World's My Oyster Soup Kitchen Floor Wax Museum" on  The Construkction of Light album. Cassetteboy released a short spoof version of the song in the wake of the 2015 Piggate scandal (the allegation that the British Prime Minister David Cameron once placed "a private part of his anatomy" into the mouth of a dead pig's head) entitled Gettin Piggy With It.

Track listing

 US CD and cassette single
 "Gettin' Jiggy wit It" – 3:50
 "Men in Black" (DJ Scratch remix) – 3:45

 US 7-inch single
 "Gettin' Jiggy wit It" – 3:50
 "Men in Black" – 3:48

 UK CD1
 "Gettin' Jiggy wit It" (album version) – 3:46
 "Men in Black" (new video mix) – 3:41
 Big Willie Style snippets – 2:56

 UK CD2
 "Gettin' Jiggy wit It" (album version) – 3:46
 "Gettin' Jiggy wit It" (Jay Scratch mix) – 3:41
 "Big Willie Style" (album version) – 3:35

 UK cassette single
 "Gettin' Jiggy wit It" (album version) – 3:46
 "Men in Black" (new video mix) – 3:41

 European CD single
 "Gettin' Jiggy wit It" (album version)
 "Gettin' Jiggy wit It" (DJ Scratch remix)

 Australian CD single
 "Gettin' Jiggy wit It"
 "Just Cruisin'" (radio edit)
 "Just Cruisin'" (instrumental)
 Snippets from Big Willie Style
 "Men in Black" (MIB altenrate mix)

Charts

Weekly charts

Year-end charts

Certifications

Release history

References

1998 singles
1998 songs
Billboard Hot 100 number-one singles
Grammy Award for Best Rap Solo Performance
Music videos directed by Hype Williams
Songs about dancing
Song recordings produced by L.E.S. (record producer)
Song recordings produced by Trackmasters
Songs written by Bernard Edwards
Songs written by Nile Rodgers
Songs written by Will Smith
Will Smith songs